Schiøtt is a surname. Notable people with the surname include:

August Schiøtt (1823–1895), Danish portrait painter
Margit Schiøtt (1889–1946), Norwegian politician